Yellow Face or yellowface may refer to:
 Portrayal of East Asians in American film and theater 
 Yellow Face (play), a 2007 play by David Henry Hwang
 Yellow Face (film), a 2010 film by Han Tang
 The Yellow Face, an alternative title for The Adventure of the Yellow Face by  Arthur Conan Doyle
 Yellowface I budgerigar mutation
 Yellowface II budgerigar mutation